Rusocin may refer to the following places:
Rusocin, Greater Poland Voivodeship (west-central Poland)
Rusocin, Opole Voivodeship (south-west Poland)
Rusocin, Pomeranian Voivodeship (north Poland)